"Wham Bam" is a 1976 song by the American group Silver, written by country songwriter Rick Giles. It was the only charting song by the group. John Batdorf sings lead vocals.

Background
Arista executives gave the band the song to record, after concluding that none of the other tracks on the album they produced had single potential. Arista head Clive Davis himself co-produced their single.

Charts
The single's title, "Wham Bam", was shown as "Wham Bam Shang-A-Lang", and peaked at No. 16 on the US Billboard Hot 100 the week of October 2, 1976. It is ranked as the 70th biggest hit of 1976. The song also charted in Canada (No. 27), performing better on the Adult Contemporary chart (No. 17).

Weekly charts

Year-end charts

In popular culture
The song appears in the 2017 Marvel Studios sequel film, Guardians of the Galaxy Vol. 2, and is included on the movie's soundtrack.

See also
 List of 1970s one-hit wonders in the United States

References

External links
 Lyrics of this song
 

Arista Records singles
1976 singles
1976 songs
Pop ballads
Songs written by Rick Giles